The qualification matches for Group 5 of the European zone (UEFA) of the 1994 FIFA World Cup qualification tournament took place between May 1992 and November 1993. The teams competed on a home-and-away basis with the winner and runner-up claiming 2 of the 12 spots in the final tournament allocated to the European zone. The group consisted of Greece, Hungary, Iceland, Luxembourg, Russia and Yugoslavia. 

In October 1992, FIFA suspended Yugoslavia as a result of the United Nations sanctions against that country stemming from the Yugoslav wars.

At the time the draw was made on 8 December 1991, Russia was known as the Soviet Union and competed at UEFA Euro 1992 as the Commonwealth of Independent States. Following  the USSR's dissolution, Ukraine proposed to arrange a separate tournament for all successors of the Soviet Union. Georgia and Armenia supported the proposal but it was blocked by Russia. The final decision on succession was taken on 1 June 1992 at the FIFA Executive Committee meeting in Stockholm.

Standings

Results

Goalscorers

4 goals

 Sergei Kiriakov

3 goals

 Kálmán Kovács
 Sergei Yuran

2 goals

 Stratos Apostolakis
 Nikos Machlas
 Tasos Mitropoulos
 Lajos Détári
 Arnór Guðjohnsen
 Eyjólfur Sverrisson

1 goal

 Vasilis Dimitriadis
 Dimitris Saravakos
 Panagiotis Sofianopoulos
 Panagiotis Tsalouchidis
 László Klausz
 Haraldur Ingólfsson
 Hörður Magnússon
 Þorvaldur Örlygsson
 Stefano Fanelli
 Aleksandr Borodiuk
 Igor Dobrovolski
 Andrei Kanchelskis
 Igor Kolyvanov
 Vasili Kulkov
 Andrei Piatnitski
 Dmitri Radchenko
 Igor Shalimov

1 own goal

 Hlynur Birgisson (playing against Luxembourg)

Notes

External links
Group 5 Detailed Results at RSSSF

5
1992–93 in Greek football
Qual
1992–93 in Hungarian football
1993–94 in Hungarian football
1993 in Icelandic football
1994 in Icelandic football
1992–93 in Luxembourgian football
1993–94 in Luxembourgian football
1992 in Russian football
1993 in Russian football
qual
1992–93 in Yugoslav football
1993–94 in Yugoslav football
1991–92 in Greek football
1991–92 in Hungarian football